The 2018–19 Pittsburgh Panthers men's basketball team represented the University of Pittsburgh during the 2018–19 NCAA Division I men's basketball season. The Panthers were led by first-year head coach Jeff Capel and played their home games at the Petersen Events Center in Pittsburgh, Pennsylvania as members of the Atlantic Coast Conference.

Previous season
The Panthers finished the 2017–18 season 8–24 overall and 0–18 in ACC play, finishing dead last in the conference and losing in the first round of the ACC tournament to Notre Dame. On March 8, 2018, Pitt fired head coach Kevin Stallings. On March 27, Pitt hired Duke assistant coach Jeff Capel as head coach.

Offseason

Departures

Incoming transfers

2018 recruiting class

Roster

}

Schedule and results

Source:

|-
!colspan=9 style=| Exhibition

|-
!colspan=9 style=| Non-conference regular season

|-
!colspan=9 style=| ACC regular season

|-
!colspan=9 style=| ACC Tournament

References

Pittsburgh Panthers men's basketball seasons
Pittsburgh
Pittsburgh
Pittsburgh